This is a list of Southern Utah Thunderbirds football players in the NFL Draft.

Key

Selections

References

Lists of National Football League draftees by college football team

Southern Utah Thunderbirds NFL Draft